Sirens Sweet & Slow is an album by the American jazz trumpeter Raphe Malik, released in 1994 on Mapleshade's sublabel OutSounds. The album was recorded in three marathon sessions that resulted in enough music to fill at least four CDs. It was planned to put together two albums, but finally only the first one was issued emphasizing the ballad and lyrical side.

Reception

The Penguin Guide to Jazz stated: "Malik manages to play big and loud without losing focus: he rarely goes for the buzzy, spluttery effects that avant-garde brassmen ofteh rely on, and his note choices are boldly decisive."

In a review for AllMusic, Scott Yanow wrote: "This set is accurately described as 'avant-garde lyricism.' Although there are many thoughtful moments along the way, the music is primarily quite explorative, with three of the selections being complete free improvisations, and the others usually just utilizing sketches... The music certainly has plenty of fire in spots and holds one's interest throughout."

Track listing
All compositions by Raphe Malik except as indicated
 "Companions" – 12:21
 "Trumpet-Drum Duo" (Malik-Warren) – 13:08
 "Trumpet-Bass Duo" (Malik-Roland) – 12:16 
 "Tenor" – 20:13
 "Pierre's Way" (Improvised) – 8:20

Personnel
Raphe Malik – trumpet
Brian Nelson – C-melody sax
Glenn Spearman – tenor sax on 4
Larry Roland – bass
Jamyll Jones - bass on 1
Dennis Warren - drums

References

1994 albums
Raphe Malik albums
Mapleshade Records albums